Airin Sultana  is a Bangladeshi actress and model. She started her media career after winning the Best Smile Award in the 2008 Pantene You Got The Look contest. She has walked on  ramps both locally and abroad. She began her film career with the film Bhalobasha Zindabad, opposite Arifin Shuvoo and directed by Debashish Biswas, which was released on 8 November 2013.

Career
Her movies include U turn directed by Alvi Ahmed, Cheleti Abol Tabol, Meyeti Pagol Pagol, by Saif Chandan, time Machine directed by Saimon Tarik, Ek Prithibi Prem directed by S A Haque Olike, Mayabini directed by Akash Acharjee, Shesh Kotha directed by Syed Wahiduzzaman Diamond, Akash mahal directed by Delwar Jahan Jhantu, Podmar Prem directed by harun-uz-zaman.

Her first television serial was Manpower by Ashutosh Sujon. Her second television mega serial was Poush Fagyner Pala, directed by Afsana Mimi.

Her debut web series was Trapped, directed by Saikat Nasir. Her second web series was Dhoka, directed by Anonno Mamun. Her first music video was Bou Ane de, singer Kazi Shuvo, directed by Saikat Nasir. Her second music video was Sweety, singer Akash Sen, directed by Anonno Mamun. Her first poetry visual was Bhul Preme kete gece Trish Bosonto, directed by Evan Monowar.

Filmography

Web series

Drama

 Serial Manpower on RTV (Finished) Character: Lead Directed by Ashotosh Sujon Chabial
 Serial: Poush Faguner Pala on ATN Bangla. Directed by Afsana mimi,Krishnochura production
 Single drama: Onuvabe Valobasha. Character: Lead, Directed by A.B. Sohel, Gamsa Multimedia Production House
 Single drama: Valobasha o Ekti kalponic kahini Directed by: Ahmed Sushmoy

Awards

References

1988 births
Living people
21st-century Bangladeshi actresses
Bangladeshi female models
Bangladeshi film actresses
People from Jessore District